LAShTAL is the first EP solely by Current 93, after the previous split EP with Nurse with Wound. The EP features musicians Fritz Häaman and John Balance in addition to the primary Current 93 member David Tibet. "LAShTAL" and "Salt" were later released on the Current 93 compilation Nature Unveiled.

Pressings
First pressing (1984) with insert, purple on center label, limited to 2000 copies. Scratched messages (only on the first press): A Side: Maldoror Est Mort, B Side: Fang
Second pressing (198?) with no insert, black on center label.
Third pressing (1988) reissue with different center label and sleeve, no insert.

Track listing
Side A
"LAShTAL"
Side B
"Salt"
"Caresse"

See also
Aleister Crowley
Thelema

References
Discogs entry

1984 debut EPs
Current 93 albums